Alexey Vyacheslavovich Liventsov (also Alexey Liventsov, ; born November 2, 1981, in Ryazan, Russian SFSR) is a Russian table tennis player. He captured three bronze medals on European Championships: in 2011 and 2012 in doubles, and in 2013 with team.

In 2017 Alexey Liventsov won Russian Championships in singles.

References

External links
 
 Alexey Liventsov – world ranking details at the International Table Tennis Federation

1981 births
Living people
Russian male table tennis players
Sportspeople from Ryazan
European Games competitors for Russia
Table tennis players at the 2015 European Games